Major John Strange Spencer-Churchill  (4 February 1880 – 23 February 1947), known as Jack Churchill, was the younger son of Lord Randolph Churchill and his wife Jennie, and the brother of former Prime Minister of the United Kingdom Sir Winston Churchill.

Early life
He was born at Phoenix Park, Dublin, Ireland, where his father, Lord Randolph, was secretary to Jack's grandfather, the 7th Duke of Marlborough, then Viceroy of Ireland.

John was educated at Harrow School in England. Jennie's sisters believed that John's actual biological father was Evelyn Boscawen.

Career

He was commissioned into the Queen's Own Oxfordshire Hussars in 1898. He served in the South African Light Horse alongside his war correspondent brother in the Second Boer War in 1899–1900. He was mentioned in dispatches, and was shot through the leg in February 1900, during the Battle of the Tugela Heights, part of the campaign for the relief of Ladysmith.

He fought in World War I, where he was again mentioned in dispatches. He served on the staff of Field Marshal Lord French, General Sir Ian Hamilton (serving as Naval Liaison Officer for the Mediterranean Expeditionary Force) and Field Marshal Lord Birdwood (serving as Camp Commandant, 1st Anzac Corps, and then as Assistant Military Secretary at the headquarters of the Fifth Army).

He reached the rank of major and was awarded the French decorations of the Croix de guerre and the Légion d'honneur and the British Distinguished Service Order in 1918. After the war, he became a businessman in the City of London firstly as a partner at stockbrokers Nelke, Phillips & Bendix from 1906 and then at Vickers, da Costa, making partner in 1921.

During World War II, after the widowed John lost his house during the Blitz, he lived in 10 Downing Street (where he used the bedrooms on the top floor formerly used by Churchill and his wife) or in the No 10 Annex.

Personal life
He married, in Oxford on 8 August 1908, Lady Gwendoline Theresa Mary Bertie (20 November 1885 – 7 July 1941), the daughter of Montagu Bertie, 7th Earl of Abingdon, and Gwendoline Mary Dormer. Lady Gwendoline had been raised as a Roman Catholic. John and his wife had three children:

 John George Spencer-Churchill (1909–1992)
 Henry Winston (known as Peregrine) Spencer-Churchill (1913–2002), who married Yvonne Henriette Mary Jehannin (1924–2010).
 (Anne) Clarissa Spencer-Churchill, later Countess of Avon (1920–2021), the wife of prime minister Anthony Eden

Jack died on 23 February 1947, aged 67, of heart disease. He is buried near his parents and brother (who outlived him for 18 years) at St Martin's Church, Bladon, near Woodstock, Oxfordshire.

Notes

References

1880 births
1947 deaths
British people of American descent
John Strange Spencer-Churchill
British Army personnel of the Second Boer War
British Army personnel of World War I
Companions of the Distinguished Service Order
Recipients of the Legion of Honour
People educated at Harrow School
Recipients of the Croix de Guerre 1914–1918 (France)
South African Light Horse officers
Queen's Own Oxfordshire Hussars officers
Burials at St Martin's Church, Bladon
Military personnel from Dublin (city)